Mosi is a surname. Notable people with the surname include:

Hil Mosi (1885–1933), Albanian politician and poet
Mihlali Mosi (born 1996), South African rugby union player

See also
Mossi (surname)